Second League of FR Yugoslavia 2001–02 (Serbian: Druga savezna liga) consist of three groups of 18 teams (Serbia) and 1 group of 12 teams (Montenegro).

Due to a reduction in the number of teams in Serbian groups (North, East and West), there were 28 teams relegated (10 in the North Group, 7 in East and 11 in West).

League table

North

East

West

South (Montenegro)

Yugoslav Second League seasons
Yugo
2001–02 in Yugoslav football